Me and My Shadows: A Family Memoir is a 1998 memoir written by Lorna Luft, the daughter of singer-actress Judy Garland.

Overview
The book, which recounts her mother's life, Luft's life with Garland and dealing with life after her mother's death, was a New York Times best seller and published by Simon & Schuster.

Adaptation
The book was adapted into an Emmy Award-winning ABC miniseries, Life with Judy Garland: Me and My Shadows, which aired February 25 and 26, 2001 and later released on DVD. It starred Tammy Blanchard as the teenage Judy and Judy Davis as the adult Judy.

External links
Me and My Shadows: A Family Memoir at Simon & Schuster
New York Times article

1998 non-fiction books
American biographies
American memoirs
Memoirs adapted into films
Show business memoirs
Judy Garland